Turves may be:
 the plural of turf
 Turves, Cambridgeshire, a village in England

See also 
 Turves Green, an area in Birmingham, England